Scotophilus bat coronavirus 512 (Bat-CoV 512) is an enveloped, single-stranded positive-sense RNA virus species in the Alphacoronavirus, or Group 1, genus with a corona-like morphology. It was isolated from a lesser Asiatic yellow house bat discovered in southern China.

Genome
Sc-BatCoV-512 shares a common evolutionary origin in the spike protein of Bat-SARS CoV. This spike protein shares similar deletions with group 2 coronaviruses in the C-terminus.

See also
Murinae
Zoonosis

References

External links
  (World Health Organization, Eastern Mediterranean Health Journal, supplement on coronavirus)
 
 Virus Pathogen Database and Analysis Resource (ViPR): Coronaviridae
 German Research Foundation (Coronavirus Consortium)

Alphacoronaviruses
Animal viral diseases
Bat diseases